John McDevitt may refer to:
 John W. McDevitt, Supreme Knight of the Knights of Columbus
 John M. McDevitt, American politician, later a Roman Catholic priest and educator

See also
 Jack McDevitt, American science fiction author